Abbajan is a 2001 Bangladeshi film directed by Kazi Hayat. It stars Manna and Sathi in lead roles.
 This movie is a remake of 1997 Tamil film Musthaffaa.

Cast
Manna
Sathi
Wasimul Bari Rajib

Soundtrack
The film's music was written by Ahmed Imtiaz Bulbul.

Soundtrack

Awards and nominations
Meril Prothom Alo Awards

Bachsas Awards

Remakes

References

Bengali remakes of Tamil films
Bengali remakes of Hindi films
Films scored by Bappi Lahiri
Bengali-language Bangladeshi films
Bengali-language Indian films
Films directed by Kazi Hayat
2000s Bengali-language films
Films scored by Ahmed Imtiaz Bulbul
2001 films